Monterey High School is a 5A high school located in central Lubbock, Texas, United States (Monterey High School became a 6A school at the beginning of the 2014–2015 academic year per the UIL realignment announcement of February 2012).  Monterey is part of the Lubbock Independent School District.  Established in 1955, Monterey was the third high school to be established in Lubbock, after Lubbock High School and Dunbar High School. Dunbar was later changed to a Junior High.

The current city of Lubbock started from the merger of two separate communities, Old Lubbock and Monterey.  In a compromise move, the residents of Old Lubbock relocated to Monterey but renamed the new community Lubbock; the high school name is in remembrance to Lubbock's past.

Notable alumni

 Terry Allen, singer-songwriter
 Gary Ashby, former head baseball coach at Texas Tech University
 Raymond Beadle, drag racer
 Kenny Bernstein, drag racer
 Chad Bettis, baseball player
 Dustin Burrows, Texas State Representative, District 83 (2015– )
 Barry Corbin, actor
 Craig Ehlo, NBA player
 Joe Ely, guitarist, singer-songwriter
 Kamie Ethridge, women's basketball player
 Jimmie Dale Gilmore, singer-songwriter
 Glenna Goodacre, sculptor
 Butch Hancock, singer-songwriter
 Wendy M. Masiello, United States Air Force officer
 James Moeser, chancellor emeritus of the University of North Carolina, Chapel Hill
 Donnie Moore, MLB Baseball player
 Gerald Myers, Texas Tech University athletic director
 Arati Prabhakar, director, DARPA
 Ron Reeves
 Duane Whitaker, actor, screen writer

References

External links
 Monterey High School

Educational institutions established in 1955
Lubbock Independent School District
High schools in Lubbock, Texas
Public high schools in Texas
1955 establishments in Texas